UFC 278: Usman vs. Edwards 2 was a mixed martial arts event produced by the Ultimate Fighting Championship that took place on August 20, 2022, at Vivint Arena in Salt Lake City, Utah, United States.

Background
The event marked the promotion's second visit to Salt Lake City, following UFC Fight Night: Rodríguez vs. Caceres in August 2016.

A UFC Welterweight Championship bout between current champion (also The Ultimate Fighter: American Top Team vs. Blackzilians welterweight winner) Kamaru Usman and Leon Edwards headlined the event. The pairing previously met at UFC on Fox: dos Anjos vs. Cowboy 2 in December 2015 where Usman defeated Edwards by unanimous decision. 

A middleweight bout between former Strikeforce and UFC Middleweight Champion Luke Rockhold and former title challenger Paulo Costa was expected to take place at UFC 277. However, the bout was postponed to this event due to unknown reasons.

A flyweight bout between Victor Altamirano and Jake Hadley was scheduled for this event. However, after Hadley pulled out of the bout due to injury he was replaced by Daniel Lacerda.

A women's flyweight bout between Miranda Maverick and Shanna Young was scheduled for the event. However, the bout was cancelled on the day of the weigh-ins as Young was hospitalized due to weight cut issues. They were rescheduled for UFC Fight Night 214.

Results

Bonus awards
The following fighters received $50,000 bonuses.
 Fight of the Night: Paulo Costa vs. Luke Rockhold
 Performance of the Night: Leon Edwards and Victor Altamirano

The following fighters received Crypto.com "Fan Bonus of the Night" awards paid in bitcoin of US$30,000 for first place, US$20,000 for second place, and US$10,000 for third place.
 First Place: Paulo Costa
 Second Place: Kamaru Usman
 Third Place: José Aldo

Reported payout 
The following is the reported payout to the fighters as reported to the Utah Athletic Commission. It is important to note the amounts do not include sponsor money, discretionary bonuses, viewership points or additional earnings. The total disclosed payout for the event was $2,542,000.

 Leon Edwards: $350,000 (no win bonus) def. Kamaru Usman: $500,000 
 Paulo Costa: $130,000 (includes $65,000 win bonus) def. Luke Rockhold: $200,000
 Merab Dvalishvili: $198,000 (includes $99,000 win bonus) def. José Aldo: $400,000
 Lucie Pudilová: $48,000 (includes $24,000 win bonus) def. Wu Yanan: $20,000
 Tyson Pedro: $86,000 (includes $43,000 win bonus) def. Harry Hunsucker: $12,000
 Marcin Tybura: $240,000 (includes $120,000 win bonus) def. Alexandr Romanov: $36,000
 Jared Gordon: $94,000 (includes $47,000 win bonus) def. Leonardo Santos: $44,000
 Sean Woodson: $24,000 vs. Luis Saldaña: $14,000
 Ange Loosa: $24,000 (includes $12,000 win bonus) def. A.J. Fletcher: $10,000
 Amir Albazi: $32,000 (includes $16,000 win bonus) def. Francisco Figueiredo: $14,000
 Aori Qileng: $24,000 (includes $12,000 win bonus) def. Jay Perrin: $12,000
 Victor Altamirano: $20,000 (includes $10,000 win bonus) def. Daniel da Silva: $10,000

See also 

 List of UFC events
 List of current UFC fighters
 2022 in UFC

References 

Ultimate Fighting Championship events
2022 in mixed martial arts
Mixed martial arts in Utah
Sports competitions in Salt Lake City
2022 in sports in Utah
Events in Salt Lake City